Tor Books is the primary imprint of Tor Publishing Group (previously Tom Doherty Associates), a publishing company based in New York City. It primarily publishes science fiction and fantasy titles, and is the largest publisher of Chinese science fiction novels in North America.

History
Tor was founded by Tom Doherty, Harriet McDougal, and Jim Baen in 1980 (Baen would found his own imprint three years later). They were soon joined by Barbara Doherty and Katherine Pendill, who then composed the original startup team. 

Tor is a word meaning a rocky pinnacle, as depicted in Tor's logo. Tor Books was sold to St. Martin's Press in 1987. Along with St. Martin's Press; Henry Holt; and Farrar, Straus and Giroux, it became part of the Holtzbrinck group, now part of Macmillan in the US.

In June 2019, Tor and other Macmillan imprints moved from the Flatiron Building, to larger offices in the Equitable Building.

Imprints
Tor is the primary imprint of Tor Publishing Group. There is also the Forge imprint that publishes an array of fictional titles, including historical novels and thrillers. Tor Books also publishes two imprints for young readers: Starscape (for readers 10 years of age and up) and Tor Teen (for readers 13 years of age and up). Tor Books also has the Tordotcom imprint that focuses on short works such as novellas, shorter novels and serializations.

A United Kingdom sister imprint, Tor UK, also exists and specializes in science fiction, fantasy, and horror, while also publishing young-adult crossover fiction based on computer-game franchises. Tor UK briefly maintained an open submission policy, which ended in January 2013.

Orb Books publishes science-fiction classics such as A. E. van Vogt's Slan.

Tor Teen publishes young-adult novels such as Cory Doctorow's Little Brother and repackages novels such as Orson Scott Card's Ender's Game for younger readers.

Tor Labs produces podcasts.

A German sister imprint, Fischer Tor, was founded in August 2016 as an imprint of S. Fischer Verlag (which also belongs to Holtzbrinck Publishing Group). It publishes international titles translated into German, as well as original German works. Fischer Tor also publishes the German online magazine Tor Online, which is based on the same concept as the English Tor.com online magazine, but has its own independent content.

Authors

Authors published by Tor and Forge include: Kevin J. Anderson, Kage Baker, Steven Brust, Orson Scott Card, Jonathan Carroll, Myke Cole, Charles de Lint, Philip K. Dick, Cory Doctorow, Steven Erikson, Sarah Gailey, Terry Goodkind, Steven Gould, Eileen Gunn, James Gunn, Brian Herbert, Glen Hirshberg, Robert Jordan, Sherrilyn Kenyon, Richard Matheson, Tamsyn Muir, Lucy A. Snyder, L. E. Modesitt, Jr., Andre Norton, Harold Robbins, Brandon Sanderson, John Scalzi, Mary Robinette Kowal, V. E. Schwab, Skyler White, and Gene Wolfe.

Tor UK has published authors such as Douglas Adams, Rjurik Davidson, Amanda Hocking, China Miéville, Adam Nevill, and Adrian Tchaikovsky.

E-books
Tor publishes a range of its works as e-books and, in 2012, Doherty announced that his imprints would sell only DRM-free e-books by July of that year. One year later, Tor stated that the removal of DRM had not harmed its e-book business, so they would continue selling them DRM-free.

In July 2018, Macmillan Publishers and Tor prompted a boycott spread across social media websites and library bulletin boards after they announced that Tor's e-books would no longer be made available for libraries to purchase and lend to borrowers, via digital distribution services such as OverDrive, until four months after their initial publication date. The company cited the "direct and adverse impact" of electronic lending on retail eBook sales but suggested that the change was part of a "test program" and could be reevaluated.

Accolades
Tor won the Locus magazine poll for best science fiction publisher in 33 consecutive years from 1988 to 2022 inclusive.

In March 2014, Worlds Without End listed Tor as the second-most awarded and nominated publisher of science fiction, fantasy and horror books, after Gollancz. At that time, Tor had received 316 nominations and 54 wins for 723 published novels, written by 197 authors. In the following year, Tor surpassed Gollancz to become the top publisher on the list.

By March 2018, Tor's record had increased to 579 nominations and 111 wins, across 16 tracked awards given in the covered genres, with a total of 2,353 published novels written by 576 authors.

References

External links
 Official website (German)
 Official website (UK)
 Official website (US)
 Tor Books profile at Reason, December 2008
 Tor Online community site (German)
 Tor.com community site	

American speculative fiction publishers
Book publishing companies based in New York (state)
Science fiction publishers
Fantasy book publishers
Weird fiction publishers
Publishing companies based in New York City
Publishing companies established in 1980
St. Martin's Press
Holtzbrinck Publishing Group